is a passenger railway station in the city of Maebashi, Gunma Prefecture, Japan, operated by the private railway operator Jōmō Electric Railway Company.

Lines

Station layout
The station consists of a double bay platform serving three tracks.

Platforms

Adjacent stations

History
Chūō-Maebashi Station opened on November 10, 1928. The original station building was burned down during the air raid on Maebashi of August 5, 1945.

Surrounding area
Gunma Prefectural Office
Maebashi City Hall
 Jōmō Railway company offices
Maebashi Central Post Office

See also
 List of railway stations in Japan

External links

  
	

Stations of Jōmō Electric Railway
Railway stations in Gunma Prefecture
Railway stations in Japan opened in 1928
Maebashi